Queen Seonpyeong of the Gim clan (d. 1179) was the older sister of Gim Yi-yeong (김이영) who became the fourth wife of King Injong of Goryeo upon their marriage in 1127. She was treated well even after his death by became the Princess Yeonsu (연수궁주, 延壽宮主) and Dowager Consort (왕태비, 王太妃) which was little lower than a queen mother since his successors were all came from Queen Im, who became the queen dowager. Meanwhile, she was later died in 1179 (9th years reign of King Myeongjong) and received her posthumous name, Seonpyeong (선평, 宣平).

In popular culture
Portrayed by Kim Bo-mi in the 2003–4 KBS TV series Age of Warriors.

References

External links
Queen Seonpyeong on Encykorea .

Royal consorts of the Goryeo Dynasty
1179 deaths
12th-century Korean women
11th-century Korean women